Dong Tichen or Ti-Chen Tung (1931 – 2 September 1966) was a Chinese anthropologist and educator. He was a pioneer in physical anthropology in China.

He was educated in Fu Jen Catholic University (Beijing Normal University) in the 1940s. He then attended Moscow State University in 1957. In the 1960s, He was invited to Fudan University by Wu Dingliang. Dong, Wu, and Liu Xian created the first department of physical anthropology at Fudan University in mainland China.

His research concentrated on paleoprimatology, dermatoglyphics, description of biological variation of ethnic minorities in China. He collected anthropometric measurements and described physical characteristics of living people in different parts of China.
In 1962, he published "The Taxonomic Position of Gigantopithecus in Primates".
In 1964, Dong published the paper "Study of dermatoglyphics of Zhuang nationality in Guangxi".

When the Cultural Revolution began in 1966, he was severely persecuted and died as a result.

References

1931 births
1966 deaths
People from Panjin
Academic staff of Fudan University
Academic staff of Fu Jen Catholic University
Catholic University of Peking alumni
Beijing Normal University alumni
Chinese anthropologists
People persecuted to death during the Cultural Revolution
Scientists from Liaoning
20th-century anthropologists